In Greek mythology, Abaris (Ancient Greek: Ἄβαρις) was a Caucasian, who was in the court of King Cepheus of Ethiopia.

Mythology 
Abaris was killed by the hero Perseus, along with the other Ethiopian chiefs, during his battle with Phineus, brother of the king and betrothed of Andromeda.
 "And next he [i.e. Perseus] slew Caucasian Abaris, and Polydaemon—from Semiramis nobly descended—and Sperchius, son, Lycetus, long-haired Elyces, unshorn, Clytus and Phlegias, the hero slew;—and trampled on the dying heaped around"

Note

References 

Publius Ovidius Naso, Metamorphoses translated by Brookes More (1859-1942). Boston, Cornhill Publishing Co. 1922. Online version at the Perseus Digital Library.
Publius Ovidius Naso, Metamorphoses. Hugo Magnus. Gotha (Germany). Friedr. Andr. Perthes. 1892. Latin text available at the Perseus Digital Library.

Characters in Greek mythology
Metamorphoses characters